This is a list of rivers of Hunan.

List

References

Bibliography
 
 

Rivers of Hunan